Frome was a constituency centred on the town of Frome in Somerset. It returned one Member of Parliament (MP)  to the House of Commons of the Parliament of the United Kingdom from 1832, until it was abolished for the 1950 general election. Between 1832 and 1885, it was a parliamentary borough; after 1885 it was a county constituency, a division of Somerset.

History 
Frome was one of the boroughs created by the Great Reform Act of 1832,  as the town was at that point one of the bigger towns in England which was not already represented, and its then-flourishing woollen manufacturing industry made it seem likely to grow further. The new borough consisted only of the town of Frome, and had a population (according to the 1831 census) of approximately 11,240. The registered electorate at the 1832 election was 322. Frome was near to Longleat, and the Marquess of Bath was influential in election outcomes throughout its life as a borough.

However, the town did not increase dramatically in size in the next few years, and the electorate was still only just over 400 by 1865, although the extension of the franchise at the 1868 election trebled this. By the time of the Third Reform Act, Frome was too small to continue as a constituency in itself and the borough was abolished with effect from the 1885 election.

The new county division into which the town was placed consisted of the whole north-eastern corner of Somerset, except for Bath, and was named after the town, as The Frome Division of Somerset. Nevertheless, Frome contributed only a minority of the voters in the constituency, which also included Weston (Bath), Radstock, Bathampton and Batheaston, to say nothing of the freeholders of Bath, who voted in this division under the arrangements that gave property owners in boroughs a vote in the adjoining county constituency; by the time of the First World War, the population was around 60,000. This constituency was a mixed one, with suburban voters at Weston and in the Bath suburbs, agricultural villages between Bath and Frome, growing mining interests round Radstock and some industry at Twerton. This made the constituency marginal between the Conservatives and Liberals, and the victor's majority was rarely more than a few hundred votes.

There were further boundary changes in 1918, when the number of constituencies in Somerset was reduced from nine to seven. Frome's boundaries were extended westwards to the fringes of Bristol, bringing in Midsomer Norton and the areas round Clutton, Chew Magna and Keynsham (previously in the Northern division): the revised constituency consisted of the urban districts of Frome, Midsomer Norton and Radstock, the Bath, Clutton and Keynsham rural districts and all but six parishes of Frome Rural District. This, too, was a marginal constituency, and except in 1923 was always won at general elections by the party which was successful nationally.

The Frome constituency was abolished in the boundary changes which came into effect at the 1950 election, Frome itself being transferred to the Wells division but most of the remainder of the constituency forming the bulk of the new Somerset North.

Members of Parliament

Frome parliamentary borough

Frome division of Somerset

Elections

Elections in the 1830s

Elections in the 1840s

Elections in the 1850s

The election was declared void on petition after Boyle was declared ineligible due to his holding of the office of Secretary to the Order of St Patrick. Ahead of the ensuing by-election, Boyle resigned this position.

Boyle's death caused a by-election.

Boyle succeeded to the peerage, becoming 9th Earl of Cork and Orrery, causing a by-election.

Elections in the 1860s

Elections in the 1870s

Lopes resigned after being appointed a judge of the Common Pleas Division of the High Court of Justice.

Elections in the 1880s

Elections in the 1890s

Elections in the 1900s

Elections in the 1910s

General Election 1914–15:

Another General Election was required to take place before the end of 1915. The political parties had been making preparations for an election to take place and by the July 1914, the following candidates had been selected; 
Liberal: John Barlow
Unionist: H. Barker-Hahlo

Elections in the 1920s

Elections in the 1930s

General Election 1939–40:

Another General Election was required to take place before the end of 1940. The political parties had been making preparations for an election to take place and by the Autumn of 1939, the following candidates had been selected; 
Conservative: Guy Dalrymple Fanshawe
Labour: Kim Mackay
British Union: Charles Hewitt

Elections in the 1940s

References 

 The Constitutional Year Book for 1913 (London: National Union of Conservative and Unionist Associations, 1913)
F. W. S. Craig, British Parliamentary Election Results 1832-1885 (2nd edition, Aldershot: Parliamentary Research Services, 1989)
 F. W. S. Craig, British Parliamentary Election Results 1918-1949 (Glasgow: Political Reference Publications, 1969)
 Henry Pelling, Social Geography of British Elections 1885-1910 (London: Macmillan, 1967)
 J. Holladay Philbin, Parliamentary Representation 1832 - England and Wales (New Haven: Yale University Press, 1965)
 Frederic A Youngs, jr, Guide to the Local Administrative Units of England, Vol I (London: Royal Historical Society, 1979)

Parliamentary constituencies in Somerset (historic)
Constituencies of the Parliament of the United Kingdom established in 1832
Constituencies of the Parliament of the United Kingdom disestablished in 1950
Frome